The following is a list of all team-to-team transactions that occurred in the National Hockey League during the 2006–07 NHL season. It lists, by date, the team each player has been traded to, signed by, or claimed by, and for which players or draft picks, if applicable.

Free agency

June

July

August

September

October

November

December

January

February

June

See also 
2006–07 NHL season
2006 NHL Entry Draft
2006 in sports
2007 in sports
2005–06 NHL transactions

References 
National Hockey League
Free agent signings
Offseason Trades

National Hockey League transactions
Trans